Sukhdev Singh may refer to:
Sukhdev Singh Kang (1931–2012), former Kerala Governor and judge
Sukhdev Singh Libra (born 1932), Indian Member of Parliament
Sukhdev Singh Dhindsa (born 1936), former Indian Minister
Sukhdev Singh Babbar (1955–1992), co-founder of Babbar Khalsa
Sukhdev Singh Sukha (1962–1992), Khalistan Commando Force member
Sukhdev Singh (footballer) (born 1991)
Sukhdev Singh (Subedar) (died 2020), Indian Army officer

See also
Sukhdevsinhji (born 1936), businessman and first-class cricketer